Shubh Vivah (English: Happy Wedding) is a 2012 Indian television drama series telecast on Sony Entertainment Television. It premiered on 27 February 2012 and went off-air on 29 June 2012.

It is loosely based on the popular Tamil serial, Metti Oli, which aired on Sun TV from 2002 to 2005. Apart from initial arc, there is no similarity between the shows.

Plot
The story begins with Mr. Saxena and his five marriageable daughters who are kind, innocent, and gentle and live in Agra.

A young man from Vrindavan named Amrit manages to impress Mr. Saxena's second daughter, Saroj but in reality he is having an affair with a married woman named Sarla. Saroj and Amrit get married. On the same day Saroj's elder sister, Karuna, marries Mr. Saxena's friend's son, Madan.

After marriage, Saroj learns of Amrit's affair but keeps it to herself. Saroj is desperate to save her marriage but fails. Though his aunt and brother try to make him realise Saroj's importance, Amrit sends her back to her home in Agra. However, after some time, Amrit and his family start missing Saroj and bring her back thus giving a new lease of life to their marriage.

Amrit's mother Kaushalya reveals details of his affair with Sarla to Saroj. She also assaults Saroj and ties her up with ropes. Saroj escapes to find Amrit but walks in on his stabbed dead body. Kaushalya blames Saroj. With help from Vinod and her sisters, Saroj is proved innocent and Sarla's husband is arrested for the murder. Saroj is discovered to be pregnant. While the family plans to get her married to Vinod against both their wishes, Saroj stops the wedding after discovering Vinod and Neelu's relationship. The two are married and the family meet Manthan, Amrit's look-alike, at the wedding.

1 year later 
Saroj has been married to Manthan and they are raising their son who they have named Amrit. Madan and Karuna, too, have a son named Rohan. Thus, the story ends on a good note.

Cast
 Rakesh Bedi as Brijmohan Saxena
 Shafaq Naaz as Karuna Saxena 
 Krutika Gaikwad as Kanchan Saxena
 Neha Narang as Meenakshi Saxena
 Neha Janpandit as Saroj Saxena / Saroj Amrit Nigam
 Eijaz Khan as Amrit Nigam / Manthan
 Vinay Rohrra as Vinod Nigam
 Vinny Arora as Neelu Saxena / Neelu Vinod Nigam
 Meenakshi Verma / Tiya Gandwani as Kaushalya Nigam
 Priya Ahuja as Shikha Nigam
 Yuvraj Malhotra as Bansi
 Aashka Goradia as Sarla Awasthi
 Asha Negi as Seethalakshmi Bai.
 Abhishek Duhan as Madan
 Sharat Sonu as Chhabban
 Pankaj Berry as Mr. Sodhi
 Vishavpreet Kaur as Mrs. Sodhi
 Amit Dolawat as Amardeep Sodhi
 Arav Chowdhary as Mr. Awasthi
 Khyaati Khandke Keswani as Advocate Konkona Mukherjee
 Rahul Lohani as Gyan
 Niyati Joshi as Chachi (Amrit and Kaushalya's landlady)
 Anup Soni as Anup Soni

Adaptations

References

Indian television series
2012 Indian television series debuts
2012 Indian television series endings
Sony Entertainment Television original programming
Wedding television shows
UTV Television
Hindi-language television series based on Tamil-language television series